Neil Holyoak is a Canadian-American singer-songwriter. Living a nomadic life between Montreal, Hong Kong, British Columbia, and Los Angeles, he performs with a shifting band that comes together under the banner Holy Oak. Holy Oak's sound is a mix of folk influences intertwined with indie rock experimentation and poetic lyrics.

Music
Neil Holyoak's music has been referred to as folk/country with a surrealist twist. There is careful attention to poetry in lyrical composition and storytelling in Holy Oak's songs. There is often an exploration of beauty coexisting in the face of melancholia in his music.

Holyoak has created four studio albums, working with well respected musicians and producers in Montreal including Howard Bilerman of Arcade Fire, Nick Kuepfer, Dave Smith, and Dave Bryant of Godspeed You Black Emperor.

Discography

Studio albums
 Holy Oak – Holy Oak (2008) 
 Better Lions – Holy Oak (2010)
 Silver Boys – Holy Oak (2013)
 Rags Across The Sun – Neil Holyoak (2014)
 Second Son – Holy Oak (2017)

References

1986 births
American alternative country singers
Canadian country guitarists
Canadian male guitarists
American folk guitarists
American male guitarists
American folk singers
Canadian folk singers
Living people
21st-century American singers
21st-century American guitarists
21st-century Canadian male singers